Francisco Manso (born 28 November 1949), is a Portuguese filmmaker and producer. He is best known as the director of the critically acclaimed films, Napomuceno's Will, The Consul of Bordeaux and O Nosso Cônsul em Havana.

Career
He graduated in law at the University of Lisbon. In 1976, he graduated in film at Centro de Arte e Comunicação Visual (Ar.Co) and, in 1979 to 1980, completed courses in sound engineering and became the assistant director at the public television service Rádio e Televisão de Portugal (RTP).

In 1978, he moved to cinema as the first assistant director for the film O Meu Nome É, directed by Fernando Matos Silva. This was followed by O Príncipe com Orelhas de Burro, directed by António de Macedo, in 1979. In 1980, he moved to Guinea Bissau and worked on the film Acto dos Feitos da Guiné which was directed by Matos Silva. In the following year, he returned to Portugal and worked on Matos Silva's 1981 film Guerra no Mirandum.

After working as an assistant for many years, Manso's first directing work was in 1983 with the television documentary A Epopeia dos Bacalhaus. He also edited his first television feature film, Terra Nova, Mar Velho, in the same year. With the success of that film, he continued to direct films and documentaries such as, A Aposta (1987), Na Mão de Deus(1989), Nostalgia (1994) and O Espírito da Cor (1994).

In 1997, Manso produced his first cinema feature film, O Testamento do Senhor Napomuceno, based on the novel The Last Will and Testament of Senhor da Silva Araújo by Germano Almeida about the Cape Verde Islands. The film was distributed internationally and was screened at film festivals, receiving several awards including three at the Gramado Film Festival. In 2000, he made the TV mini-series Almeida Garrett. His documentary, Memórias de um rio - Avieiros, os nómadas do Tejo in 2004, was awarded the special prize for Lusophony at the 10th Environmental Film Festival - Cine Eco 2004.

In his following films he mostly used historical events, such as the 2008 film O Último Condenado à Morte, which took place at the time of the Liberal Revolution in Portugal in 1821/22. In 2011, he made the film O Cônsul de Bordéus which was based on the life of Aristides de Sousa Mendes and his services to humanity during the persecution of the Jews.

Filmography

See also
 Portuguese Colonial War
 List of Portuguese films of 2008
 List of Portuguese films of 2010

References

External links
 
 Francisco Manso
 A Ilha dos Escravos/Slave Island (2008): An Interview with Francisco Manso

Living people
Portuguese film directors
Portuguese producers
People from Lisbon
1949 films
1949 births